James Oliver Wild (born 5 January 1977) is a British Conservative Party politician.  He has been the Member of Parliament (MP) for North West Norfolk since the 2019 general election.

Early life and career
Wild was born in Norwich, the son of Keith and Rhona Wild. He attended Manor Road Primary School, the fee-paying Norwich School, and later studied at Queen Mary College, University of London, where he obtained a BA in politics in 1998.

In 1999, he became Head of Information and Research at the Communication Group, holding the role until 2001. From 2000 to 2001, he was Business Policy Advisor to the Conservative Research Department. Wild worked as a Senior Account Executive for Politics Direct from 2001 to 2004.

He then worked in public relations, initially as a Public Affairs Manager for T Mobile (from 2004 to 2009), and then as an Account Director for Hanover Communications (from 2009 to 2012).

From 2012 to 2014, Wild was a Special Advisor to the Minister for Business and Energy. He became a Special Adviser to the Secretary of State for Defence in 2014, remaining in the role until 2017. He was made Chief of Staff to the Chancellor of the Duchy of Lancaster and Minister for the Cabinet Office in 2018, and the following year, became a Senior Special Adviser to the Prime Minister.

Parliamentary career 
In November 2019, he became Conservative Party candidate for North West Norfolk, which has generally been a safe seat for the Conservatives. He was elected with a majority of 19,922 at the general election that December, and entered the House of Commons on 13 December 2019.

On 16 January 2020, Wild delivered his Maiden Speech in the House of Commons in the Health and Social Care debate. Wild has been a member of Public Accounts Committee since 2 March 2020.

Wild was critical of the cost of the NHS Test and Trace system, saying that "mistakes have been made". Wild highlighted the "overuse of consultants" as a particular problem.

Wild condemned the approach of the Metropolitan Police to the Sarah Everard vigil, saying "policing is by consent" and that "tonight the [Metropolitan Police] have failed [and] the scenes of women being manhandled at a vigil are appalling".

In March 2021, Wild asked the BBC Director General, Tim Davie, about the lack of union flags in the BBC's annual report. Wild suggested that the upcoming annual report could include "some imagery around the union flag".

In the July–September 2022 Conservative Party leadership election, Wild supported former Chancellor of the Exchequer Rishi Sunak.

Personal life
Wild married Natalie Evans in 2010, who became a life peer in 2014. She served as Leader of the House of Lords and Lord Keeper of the Privy Seal from 2016 to 2022.

His recreations are listed in Who's Who as football, running, cricket, surfing, Poirot, classic cars and real ale. He is a member of Norwich City Football Club.

References

External links

1977 births
Living people
Spouses of life peers
UK MPs 2019–present
British special advisers
Conservative Party (UK) MPs for English constituencies